Richard Becker may refer to:

Politics
 Richard M. Becker (1931–2007), Kansas state legislator
 Richard L. Becker (1905–2004), Kansas state legislator
 Rick Becker, member of the North Dakota House of Representatives

Sports
 Richard Becker (tennis) (born 1991), German tennis player
 Rich Becker (born 1972), American baseball outfielder
 Dick Becker, American drag racer

Other
 Richard Becker (physicist) (1887–1955), German theoretical physicist
 Richard Becker (music publisher), American music publisher
 Richard S. Becker (1926–2015), United States Air Force flying ace

See also